The Roman Catholic Archdiocese of Moncton is a Roman Catholic archdiocese that includes part of the Province of New Brunswick.

Its suffragan dioceses are Bathurst in Canada, Edmundston, and Saint John, New Brunswick.

On Friday, June 15, 2012, according to the English translation of the Vatican Press Office's Vatican Information Service (VIS) daily news bulletin, Pope Benedict XVI accepted the resignation from the governance of the Archdiocese of Moncton, New Brunswick, Canada, presented by Archbishop André Richard, C.S.C., in accordance with canon 401 § 1 of the 1983 Code of Canon Law. Pope Benedict appointed Bishop Valéry Vienneau as the Metropolitan Archbishop-elect of Moncton to succeed Archbishop Emeritus Richard; Archbishop-elect Vienneau until his appointment had been the Bishop of the Roman Catholic Diocese of Bathurst, a suffragan diocese of the Archdiocese based in the city of Bathurst, New Brunswick.

As of 2004, the archdiocese contained 48 parishes, 44 active diocesan priests, 26 religious priests, and 108,000 Catholics. It also had 291 Women Religious, 47 Religious Brothers, and 1 permanent deacon.

Bishops
The following is a list of the bishops and archbishops of Moncton and their terms of service:
Louis-Joseph-Arthur Melanson  (1936–1941)
Norbert Robichaud   (1942–1972)
Donat Chiasson (1972–1995)
Ernest Léger (1996–2002)
André Richard (2002–2012)
Valéry Vienneau (since 2012)

Other priests of this diocese who became bishops
 Albini LeBlanc, appointed Bishop of Hearst, Ontario in 1940
 Daniel Joseph Bohan, appointed Auxiliary Bishop of Toronto, Ontario in 2003

References

External links
Archdiocese of Moncton page at catholichierarchy.org

 
Catholic Church in New Brunswick
Albert County, New Brunswick
Kent County, New Brunswick
Northumberland County, New Brunswick
Westmorland County, New Brunswick
Organizations based in Moncton
1936 establishments in New Brunswick